Priyam is a 2000 Indian Malayalam-language romantic comedy film directed by Sanal and starring Kunchacko Boban, Arun, Ashwin, Manjima Mohan and Deepa Nair in the lead roles.

Plot
Benny, an orphan, takes care of his sister's three children. Benny's best friend at the orphanage was Annie, who was taken away by her father. She decides to return to Benny. But fate has other plans.

Cast
 Kunchako Boban as Benny
 Deepa Nair as Annie Joshua
 Thilakan as Church Priest
 Jagathy Sreekumar as Unni
 Shruthi Raj as Nancy (Avarachan's daughter)
 Devan as Joshua
 Jyothi Meena
 Sukumari as Joshua's mother
 Master Arun as Tinu
 Master Ashwin Thampi as Vinu
 Manjima Mohan as Anu
 N. F. Varghese as Avarachan
 Indrans as Unni's Assistant
 Kanakalatha as Unni's Wife

Soundtrack 
The film's soundtrack contains six songs, all composed by Berny Ignatius, with lyrics by S. Ramesan Nair.

References

External links
 

2000 films
2000s Malayalam-language films
Films scored by Berny–Ignatius
Films scored by M. Jayachandran